Théophilus Gerardus Steurs (13 June 1901 – 7 June 1961) was a Belgian long-distance runner. He competed in the marathon at the 1924 and 1928 Summer Olympics.

References

External links
 

1901 births
1961 deaths
Athletes (track and field) at the 1924 Summer Olympics
Athletes (track and field) at the 1928 Summer Olympics
Belgian male long-distance runners
Belgian male marathon runners
Olympic athletes of Belgium